The Miglia Quadrato is an annual car treasure hunt which takes place on the second or third weekend in May within the City of London (known as the 'Square Mile'). It is organised by the United Hospitals and University of London Motoring Club (UHULMC). The event has been running since 1957.

History
The event was originally conceived in 1957 in response to the fuel shortages from the Suez Crisis. This meant that traditional car rallying was less viable due to fuel shortages and so concentrating a competition in the City of London would reduce distances covered.

In the early 1990s the ring of steel was introduced to the City of London. This added a degree of complexity to navigation of the event, as it resulted in a limited number of entry and exit points for areas bordering Liverpool Street Station.

Format

Teams of up to six people drive around the city for five hours trying to find the answers to sixty clues. A point is scored for each clue answer correctly recorded, and a point is lost for every minute the team is late at the end of the five hours. A reduced scale map based on the 1:10 000 scale Ordnance Survey Landplan map of the City is provided, along with a sheet of the sixty clues. Each clue is an eight digit Ordnance Survey grid reference (which defines a 10 m by 10 m area to search) and a quotation of some text or number that can be found at the location, with some parts missing, which need to be found and written down as the answer.

The hunt runs from midnight to 5am the following Sunday. With sixty clues to solve in five hours, there is an average of five minutes per clue, in which time the location must be plotted on the map, driven to, and the relevant text from the clue found. The clues can be visited in any order. There are 20 easy, 20 medium and 20 difficult clues.

Engraved plaques are awarded to the highest scoring teams. In a typical year, the winning score is in the mid-fifties, though in 2019 it was as low as 41 and in 2018 a clean sheet of 60 was achieved for the first time. Ties are separated by team size (smallest wins) and then by relative scores for the difficult and medium clues respectively.

Location
The City has a small resident population, most of whom live in the Barbican, which has strictly separated pedestrian and vehicle circulation. The hunt avoids the Barbican and the hospitals to avoid disturbing residents. The event's finishing point is normally Finsbury Circus.

There is a sister event called the Londinium Pedo, which is a three-hour event taking place on foot in September or October. Both events are run by the United Hospitals and University of London Motoring Club (UHULMC).

Cancelled events
In 2001, the event was cancelled in recognition of the need to reduce population movement due to an outbreak of foot and mouth disease. The 2012 event was cancelled due to the difficulty of travel in London resulting from preparations for the 2012 Olympic Games. In 2020, the event was cancelled due to the COVID-19 pandemic.

References

External links
 http://www.uhulmc.org/mq-description.htm

Outdoor locating games
Festivals in the City of London